Ursprung Buam is an Austrian folk music trio from Zillertal, Tyrol.  One of the most popular touring groups in Austria, Ursprung Buam often tours Germany, many places across the European Union, as well as the Tirolean festival scene. They have had over twenty releases since 1998. Most of these albums have held strong positions on the Austrian popular music charts. The group consists of brothers Martin Brugger (born 11 December 1976) and Andreas Brugger (born 29 December 1978) and their older cousin, Mannfred Höllwarth (born 5 April 1962).  Founded in 1993, the trio is widely considered Austria's number-one folk music group; in 2001, the group won the Austria Music Award - Amadeus in recognition of its status.  On 12 March 2011 they performed "Grande Canale" as Musikantenstadl celebrated their 30-year anniversary of being on TV.

Ursprung Buam means "Origin Boys" in Austro-Bavarian, in which their song lyrics are written as well.

Martin Brugger plays the fiddle, and Andreas Brugger the accordion; Höllwarth plays the bass and harp.  The group cultivates the art of yodeling in its songs, which focus on the Zillertal region.

Discography

Studio albums 
 2020 Weihnachten mit Den Ursprung Buam
 2020 Walpurgisnacht
 2019 Hund hemma scho
 2018 25 Jahre - 25 Lieder
 2017 C'est la Vie
 2016 Trachtig übernachtig
 2015 Große Erfolge
 2015 Do ist der Wurm drin
 2014 A Geig'n muass her
 2013 Gamsjaga
 2012 Das Beste - Live
 2012 Adam und Eva
 2011 Mück'n fliagn
 2010 Amors Pfeil
 2009 Hereinspaziert ins Zillertal
 2008 Grande Canale
 2008 Unsere schönsten volkstümlichen Schlager
 2007 Ursprung Baum-Star Edition (compilation)
 2007 Diamanten der Volksmusik
 2007 A fesches boarisches Madl
 2007 Sonderedition (3 disk compilation)
 2006 Zwei rehbraune Augen
 2005 Hit-Mix (compilation)
 2005 Ein Casanova kann nicht aufgeig'n
 2004 Das Beste der Ursprung Buam (compilation)
 2004 Der Geigenspieler aus dem Zillertal
 2004 Aufgeigt weacht im Zillertal
 2004 S'Original vom Zillertal
 2004 Gold (compilation)
 2003 Die schönsten Jodler
 2003 Romeo & Julia
 2002 Don Camillo und Peppone
 2001 Damenwahl hamma heit'
 2000 A urige Weihnacht
 2000 I bin der Teufelsgeigerbua
 1999 Aufgeigt weacht
 1998 A Riesenstimmung aus dem Zillertal

Live albums 
 2007 Live Im Zillertal

Other 
 2007 Ursprung Buam - Live im Zillertal DVD
 2005 Ursprung Buam - Ein Casanova kann nicht aufgeig'n DVD

External links
Official website
Austrian Popular Music Page with Ursprung Baum

Tyrolean culture
Austrian folk music groups
Yodelers